FDIC may refer to:

 Federal Deposit Insurance Corporation, a U.S. government organ, deposit insurer and bank regulator
 FDIC International (Fire Department Instructors Conference), an annual firefighting conference and exhibition
 Front for the Defence of Constitutional Institutions, a Moroccan political party
 National Razor (band), also known as F.D.I.C., a U.S. punk band

See also

 
 Rodriguez v. FDIC, a U.S. Supreme Court case, which made a determination on the Bob Richards Rule